Searight is a surname. Notable people with the surname include:

Benjamin F. Searight (1873–1937), American football player and coach
Kenneth Searight (1883–1957), British language creator
Robert Searight (born c. 1976), American drummer
Theresa Clay Searight (1911–1995), English entomologist